This is a list of video games for the PlayStation Portable video game console that have sold or shipped at least one million copies. The best-selling game on the PlayStation Portable is Grand Theft Auto: Liberty City Stories. An action-adventure game developed in a collaboration between Rockstar Leeds and Rockstar North, Liberty City Stories was originally released in North America on October 24, 2005, and went on to sell 8million units worldwide. The second-best-selling game on the console is Grand Theft Auto: Vice City Stories (2006), which sold just over 5million units. The top five is rounded out by Monster Hunter Portable 3rd (2010) selling 4.9million units, Gran Turismo (2009) with over 4million units sold, and Monster Hunter Freedom Unite (2008) with 3.8 million units sold.

As of March 31, 2012, over 331 million total copies of games have been sold for the PlayStation Portable.

List

Notes

References

 
PlayStation Portable
Best-selling PlayStation video games